Cork North-West is a parliamentary constituency represented in Dáil Éireann, the lower house of the Irish parliament or Oireachtas. The constituency elects 3 deputies (Teachtaí Dála, commonly known as TDs) on the system of proportional representation by means of the single transferable vote (PR-STV).

History and boundaries
The constituency was created by the Electoral (Amendment) Act 1980 and first used at the 1981 general election. It is a large rural 3-seat constituency. Due to its size and landscape it is considered one of the most difficult constituencies to canvass in Ireland. The constituency encompasses the western part of Ireland's largest county of Cork. It runs from Charleville and Rockchapel in the north to Ballingeary, Crookstown and Crossbarry in the south, and also takes in parts of the Mallow and Fermoy electoral areas.

TDs

Elections

2020 general election

2016 general election

2011 general election

2007 general election

2002 general election

1997 general election

1992 general election

1989 general election

1987 general election

November 1982 general election

February 1982 general election

1981 general election

See also
Elections in the Republic of Ireland
Politics of the Republic of Ireland
List of Dáil by-elections
List of political parties in the Republic of Ireland

References

External links
 Oireachtas Constituency Dashboards
 Oireachtas Members Database

Dáil constituencies
Politics of County Cork
1981 establishments in Ireland
Constituencies established in 1981